Elections to Bolton Metropolitan Borough Council were held on 3 May 1980. The whole council was up for election, with boundary changes since the last election in 1979. The Labour Party gained control of the Council from the Conservatives, who had previously been in control almost continuously since 1966. The overall number of councillors was reduced to 60 compared with 69 in 1979. The Labour Party made a net gain of 6 seats and the Conservatives a net loss of 15. Following this election, Cllr Robert Howarth of Central Ward was elected Leader of the Council and was to remain Leader until 2004, one of the longest serving Council leaders in the UK.

Election result

Ward results

Astley Bridge ward

Blackrod ward

Bradshaw ward

Breightmet ward

Bromley Cross ward

Burnden ward

Central ward

Daubhill ward

Deane cum Heaton ward

Derby ward

Farnworth ward

Halliwell ward

Harper Green ward

Horwich ward

Hulton Park ward

Kearsley ward

Little Lever ward

Smithills ward

Tonge ward

Westhoughton ward

References

 

1980
1980 English local elections
1980s in Greater Manchester